The Ridgefin eel (Callechelys springeri) is an eel in the family Ophichthidae (worm/snake eels). It was described by Isaac Ginsburg in 1951, originally under the genus Gordiichthys. It is a marine, tropical eel which is known from the eastern Gulf of Mexico, in the western Atlantic Ocean.

References

Ophichthidae
Fish described in 1951